John Sanborn Phillips (1861–1949) attended Knox College in Illinois, where he worked on the student newspaper and met S. S. McClure. In 1887 McClure hired him to manage the home office of the McClure Newspaper Syndicate (founded in 1884).

The two went on to found the famous McClure's Magazine, first published in June 1893, where Phillips was co-editor. In 1900 Phillips became a partner in the publisher McClure, Phillips and Company.

In 1906, he left McClure's with Ida Tarbell, along with Lincoln Steffens and Ray Stannard Baker to purchase American Illustrated Magazine and convert it into The American Magazine.

Personal life
Phillips was the son of Edgar L. Phillips (1827-1908) and Mary Lavinia Sanborn (1835-1914). Edgar's mother was Sarah Evertson, a member of a prominent Dutch American family from New York City. Through his father he was a descendant of Reverend George Phillips, founder of Watertown, Massachusetts and the progenitor of the New England Phillips family.

His grandson Samuel Huntington (son of Richard Thomas Huntington and Dorothy Sanborn Phillips) was a professor at Harvard University and a well-known political scientist.

References

Further reading

1861 births
1949 deaths
Knox College (Illinois) alumni
American magazine publishers (people)
McClure's
American people of Dutch descent
American people of English descent
Phillips family (New England)
Schuyler family
Woolsey family
American investigative journalists